Ga District is a former district that was located in Greater Accra Region, Ghana. Originally created as an ordinary district assembly in 1988. However in 2004, it was split off into two new districts: Ga West District (which it was elevated to municipal district assembly status on 29 February 2008; capital: Amasaman) and Ga East District (which it was also elevated to municipal district assembly status on 29 February 2008; capital: Abokobi). The district assembly was located in the western part of Greater Accra Region and had Amasaman as its capital town.

Tribes
The Ga District is divided in different sub-areas. The Ga people are the original citizens of the Ga District. Today Ga is a melting pot of different cultural and ethnic groups from all over the world.

Important historical GaDangmemei
Great GaDangme historical personalities who contributed significantly to the development of the GaDangme people, traditions, and culture, and Ghana (formerly, the Gold Coast) include:

 Dr. Ebenezer Ako Adjei (1916-2002)
 Dr. Benjamin Quartey-Papafio (1859-1924)
 Lt. General Joseph Arthur Ankrah (1915-1992), soldier and head of state 1966–69.
 Sir Emmanuel Quist (died 1959), judge and politician
 Nene Annorkwei II (born 1900), QMC, GM
 Rev. Carl Christian Reindorf (1834-1917)
 Rev. Samuel Richard Brew Attoh-Ahuma (1863-1921)
 Christian Josiah Reindorf (1868-1937)
 Edmund Bannerman (1832-1903)
 Rev. John Ahoomah Solomon
 George Cleland 
 Daniel Quaye Tawiah ("Kwei Nungua")
 Rev. E. A. W. Engmann (1903-1983)
 King Tackie Yaaboi
 Hon. John Glover-Addo (1873-1933), lawyer and politician
 King Tackie Tawiah I
 Hon. Thomas Hutton-Mills, Sr. (1865-1931), lawyer and politician
 Chief John Vanderpuije
 Hon. Sir Nene Azu Mate-Kole
 Hon. Dr. Frederick Nanka-Bruce (1878-1953), physician, journalist and politician
 Tetteh Quarshie (1842-1892), father of Ghana's cocoa industry

References 

Districts of Greater Accra Region

Former districts of Ghana

Greater Accra Region